Michael Adolfo Fernández (born 9 February 1994, in San Juan)  is a Puerto Rican retired footballer who played as a midfielder for Criollos de Caguas and he also played with Puerto Rican national team.

References

External links 
 

1994 births
Living people
Puerto Rican footballers
Puerto Rico international footballers
Sportspeople from San Juan, Puerto Rico
Association football midfielders